is a Japanese equestrian. He competed at the 2000 Summer Olympics and the 2004 Summer Olympics.

References

1968 births
Living people
Japanese male equestrians
Olympic equestrians of Japan
Equestrians at the 2000 Summer Olympics
Equestrians at the 2004 Summer Olympics
People from Katori, Chiba
Asian Games medalists in equestrian
Equestrians at the 2002 Asian Games
Asian Games gold medalists for Japan
Asian Games bronze medalists for Japan
Medalists at the 2002 Asian Games